The Abbey of Saint-Léonard des Chaumes was a Cistercian monastery in Dompierre-sur-Mer in the province of Aunis in the Kingdom of France. It was destroyed in the 18th century.

History
The abbey was probably founded in 1036 by Odo, Count of Gascony. The establishment was originally poor —chaumes meant "uncultivated land" in Old French. In 1168, the establishment, which had been a priory for a century, joined the Cistercian Order and became a daughter house of Bœuil Abbey in Limousin. Later, it was handed over to Billon Abbey.

Like many other abbeys in the 15th-century, Saint-Léonard des Chaumes and its goods were placed under the authority of a layman for whom the monastery was a source of revenue rather than a place of worship. Vincent de Paul briefly served as commander of the abbey from 1610. At this time, the commendatory regime and the war (the first Siege of La Rochelle) already had visible negative consequences. Vicent de Paul resigned from commendatory office in 1616.

In 1723, the abbey was mentioned as completely destroyed.

According to Janauschek, the abbey had the order number CCCC (400).

References

Cistercian monasteries in France
11th-century establishments in France
1036 establishments in Europe
Buildings and structures in Charente-Maritime
Buildings and structures demolished in the 18th century
Aunis
18th-century disestablishments in France
Religious buildings and structures completed in 1036